The 2006 4 Nations Cup, an annual women's ice hockey tournament, was held at the Kitchener Memorial Auditorium in Kitchener, Ontario, Canada, and took place from 7  to 11 November 2006.

Results

7 November 2006

8 November 2006

10 November 2006

Final standings

Finals

Bronze medal match
11 November 2006

Gold medal match
11 November 2006

Statistics

Top scorers

Goalies

External links
 2006 4 Nations Cup (Hockey Canada) on Wayback Machine
 3/4 Nations Cup at the Women's Hockey Web

See also
 4 Nations Cup

2006–07
2006–07 in Finnish ice hockey
2006–07 in Swedish ice hockey
2006–07 in Canadian women's ice hockey
2006–07 in American women's ice hockey
2006–07
2006–07 in women's ice hockey